These are men's player records in international rugby, updated at the conclusion of the Autumn internationals window each year.

To view men's international team records, see International rugby union team records.
To view records of the men's Rugby World Cup, see Records and statistics of the Rugby World Cup.

Career

Caps 

*Players who are still active at international level, or who have not yet announced international retirement, are in bold. Players who are still active at club level but have either retired from international rugby or have not been selected for their national team for a year or more are in italics.

Caps as captain 

*Players who are still active at international level, or who have not yet announced international retirement, are in bold. Players who are still active at club level but have either retired from international rugby or have not been selected for their national team for a year or more are in italics.

Wins 

*Players who are still active at international level, or who have not yet announced international retirement, are in bold. Players who are still active at club level but have either retired from international rugby or have not been selected for their national team for a year or more are in italics.

Consecutive wins 

 ' * ', accompanied with ' N 's indicates that the sequence is ongoing or unbroken.

*Players who are still active at international level, or who have not yet announced international retirement, are in bold. Players who are still active at club level but have either retired from international rugby or have not been selected for their national team for a year or more are in italics. Players that have played only Tier 1 and/or Tier 2 nations during their winning run are eligible.

Consecutive matches without loss 

 ' * ', accompanied with ' N 's indicates that the sequence is ongoing or unbroken. ' N 's may also indicate the unbeaten run was uninterrupted by any draws or losses.
A. Whetton was involved in two draws during his unbeaten run.

Players who are still active at international level, or who have not yet announced international retirement, are in bold. Players who are still active at club level but have either retired from international rugby or have not been selected for their national team for a year or more are in italics. Players that have played only Tier 1 and/or Tier 2 nations during their unbeaten run are eligible.

Most points 

Players currently active at international level are listed in bold; those not playing at international level but still active at club level are listed in italics.
Players whose rows are in italics represent nations classed as Tier 2, since the beginning of the professional era (August 1995), and primarily play other Tier 2, or Tier 3 nations.

Most tries 

Players currently active at international level are listed in bold; those not playing at international level but still active at club level are listed in italics.
Players whose rows are in italics represent nations classed as Tier 2, since the beginning of the professional era (August 1995), and primarily play other Tier 2, or Tier 3 nations.

Most conversions 
Updated: November 2022

Players currently active at international level are listed in bold; those not playing at international level but still active at club level are listed in italics.
Players whose rows are in italics represent nations classed as Tier 2, since the beginning of the professional era (August 1995), and primarily play other Tier 2, or Tier 3 nations.

Most penalties 
Updated: November 2022

Players currently active at international level are listed in bold; those not playing at international level but still active at club level are listed in italics.
Players whose rows are in italics represent nations classed as Tier 2, since the beginning of the professional era (August 1995), and primarily play other Tier 2, or Tier 3 nations.

Most drop goals 

Players currently active at international level are listed in bold; those not playing at international level but still active at club level are listed in italics.

Most red cards 
Updated: 3 March 2023

Players currently active at international level are listed in bold; those not playing at international level but still active at club level are listed in italics.
There are 175 players with 1 red card to their name. For the purpose of limiting the list to a reasonable size, only players with 2 red cards are shown here.

Most yellow cards 
Updated: 03 Oct 2021

Players currently active at international level are listed in bold; those not playing at international level but still active at club level are listed in italics.

Rugby World Cup 
For the comprehensive list of Rugby World Cup Individual records, see Records and statistics of the Rugby World Cup.

Appearances 

*Players who are still active at international level, or who have not yet announced international retirement, are in bold. Players who are still active at club level but have either retired from international rugby or have not been selected for their national team for a year or more are in italics.

Multiple winners 

*Players who are still active at international level, or who have not yet announced international retirement, are in bold. Players who are still active at club level but have either retired from international rugby or have not been selected for their national team for a year or more are in italics.

Calendar year 
These are player records spanning a calendar year (1 January to 31 December).

Most matches 

Players currently active at international level are listed in bold; those not playing at international level but still active at club level are listed in italics.
There are 37 players that have played 15 Test Matches in a calendar year. For the purpose of limiting the list to a reasonable size, the players with the five highest winning percentages are shown here.
Players whose rows' are italicised have matches played against teams not considered their nations top representative side included in their tally.

Most wins 
Players that have played matches involving only Tier 1 and/or Tier 2 nations during the calendar year are eligible.

Players currently active at international level are listed in bold; those not playing at international level but still active at club level are listed in italics.

Most points 
Updated: 8 March 2020

Players currently active at international level are listed in bold; those not playing at international level but still active at club level are listed in italics.
Players whose rows are in italics represent nations classed as Tier 2, since the beginning of the professional era (August 1995), and primarily play other Tier 2, or Tier 3 nations.

Most tries 
Players that have played Tier 1 sides in 50% or more of their test matches in that year are eligible.

Players currently active at international level are listed in bold; those not playing at international level but still active at club level are listed in italics.

Most conversions 
Updated: 8 March 2020

Players currently active at international level are listed in bold; those not playing at international level but still active at club level are listed in italics.

Most penalties 
Updated: 8 March 2020

Players currently active at international level are listed in bold; those not playing at international level but still active at club level are listed in italics.

Most drop goals 
Updated: 8 March 2020

Players currently active at international level are listed in bold; those not playing at international level but still active at club level are listed in italics.

Matches

Most points 
Test matches that have included only Tier 1 and/or Tier 2 nations are eligible.

Players currently active at international level are listed in bold; those not playing at international level but still active at club level are listed in italics.
Players whose rows are in italics represent nations classed as Tier 2.

Most points on debut 
Test matches that have included only Tier 1 and/or Tier 2 nations are eligible.

Players currently active at international level are listed in bold; those not playing at international level but still active at club level are listed in italics.
Players whose rows are in italics represent nations classed as Tier 2.

Most tries 
Test matches that have included only Tier 1 and/or Tier 2 nations are eligible.

Players currently active at international level are listed in bold; those not playing at international level but still active at club level are listed in italics.
Players whose rows are in italics represent nations classed as Tier 2, since the beginning of the professional era (August 1995), and primarily play other Tier 2, or Tier 3 nations.

Most tries on debut 
Test matches that have included only Tier 1 and/or Tier 2 nations are eligible.

Players currently active at international level are listed in bold; those not playing at international level but still active at club level are listed in italics.
Players whose rows are in italics represent nations classed as Tier 2, since the beginning of the professional era (August 1995), and primarily play other Tier 2, or Tier 3 nations.

Most conversions 
Test matches that have included only Tier 1 and/or Tier 2 nations are eligible.

Players currently active at international level are listed in bold; those not playing at international level but still active at club level are listed in italics.
Players whose rows are in italics represent nations classed as Tier 2, since the beginning of the professional era (August 1995), and primarily play other Tier 2, or Tier 3 nations.

Most conversions on debut 
Test matches that have included only Tier 1 and/or Tier 2 nations are eligible.

Players currently active at international level are listed in bold; those not playing at international level but still active at club level are listed in italics.
Players whose rows are in italics represent nations classed as Tier 2.

Most penalties 
Test matches that have included only Tier 1 and/or Tier 2 nations are eligible.

Players currently active at international level are listed in bold; those not playing at international level but still active at club level are listed in italics.
Players whose rows are in italics represent nations classed as Tier 2.

There are 14 players with 8 penalties kicked in a match to their name. For the purpose of limiting the list to a reasonable size, the players with the 5 highest match scores are shown here (listed chronologically).

Most penalties on debut 
Test matches that have included only Tier 1 and/or Tier 2 nations are eligible.

Players currently active at international level are listed in bold; those not playing at international level but still active at club level are listed in italics.
Players whose rows are in italics represent nations classed as Tier 2.

Most drop goals 
Test matches that have included only Tier 1 and/or Tier 2 nations are eligible.

Players currently active at international level are listed in bold; those not playing at international level but still active at club level are listed in italics.
Players whose rows are in italics represent nations classed as Tier 2.

There are 18 players with 3 drop goals kicked in a match to their name. For the purpose of limiting the list to a reasonable size, the players with the 8 highest match scores are shown here (listed chronologically).

Most drop goals on debut 
Test matches that have included only Tier 1 and/or Tier 2 nations are eligible.

Players currently active at international level are listed in bold; those not playing at international level but still active at club level are listed in italics.
Players whose rows are in italics represent nations classed as Tier 2.

See also
 International rugby union team records
 Records and statistics of the Rugby World Cup
 List of international rugby union teams

References

External links
 Rugby Union Records
 Rugby Union Match Archive

Rugby union records and statistics